ElimiDate is an American reality television dating show in which one contestant chooses between four contestants of the opposite sex by eliminating them one by one in three total rounds. On August 11, 2006, it was announced that the show would not be renewed for the 2006–2007 season due to low ratings, and the show went out of syndication after September 5, 2006.

The syndicated program premiered on 17 September 2001 and was produced by Dawn Syndicated Productions in association with Telepictures Productions, and distributed by Telepictures Distribution (2001–2003), and Warner Bros. Television Distribution (2003–2006). The show was produced by Alex Duda. The narrator was Dale Inghram.

Nationwide in the United States, it was broadcast on cable late nights on Superstation WGN. ElimiDate was also available on AOL's free video-streaming channel, In2TV until it was shut down.

The show was popular due to it being designed to be aired around or past midnight, when their target audience was just coming home from being out or ending their studies for the evening. It developed a cult following of sorts among college students nationwide.

On 11 August 2006, it was announced that the show would not be renewed for the 2006–2007 season due to low ratings, and the show went out of syndication after 5 September 2006.

Format 
The reality television dating show features one contestant who chooses between four contestants of the opposite sex by eliminating them one by one in three total rounds. The contestant (sometimes female, but usually male) meets their four dates one by one, and then give their first impression in a confessional-style cut scene. The other four contestants then size each other up along with the contestant within their own confessional scenes.

The group of five is cut one-by-one each round, and in each round the group usually goes to a different place. The show starts out in the late afternoon at a public place (e.g. a city park or restaurant). Then, when there are only two suitors left, the setting moves to a hot tub or VIP area of a club where different sexual actions are apt to happen.

Typically, the contestants are very competitive and direct insulting comments towards one another many times during an episode. There are rare cases of fighting, but "catty" bickering is the major draw of the show.  The extremity of some of the cattiness suggests handling and line-feeding from producers, and contestants respond to these situations in interview sequences filmed after the fact. Most eliminations are preceded by some variation of the phrase I liked everybody but unfortunately the name of the game is 'ElimiDate', so I have to make a cut. So I decided to cut.... Contestants who are cut have the opportunity to react to their dismissal. Many eliminated contestants, who are often visibly intoxicated, insult the contestant who eliminated them, claiming He/she wasn't my type, anyway.

Initially, episodes rotated between Los Angeles, Miami, and New York City, but the popularity of the program encouraged the producers to film episodes in other cities. Episodes were filmed in over three dozen cities, including Atlanta, Baltimore, Chicago, Columbus, Little Rock, St. Paul, Jacksonville, Phoenix, Raleigh and Sacramento, and the syndicators usually received strong support from their affiliate stations to find contestants for the series within their cities through casting calls.

ElimiDate Deluxe 
A network version of ElimiDate aired concurrently with the syndicated run called ElimiDate Deluxe on the WB for the 2001–2002 season, but was dropped after just a few airings.

British version 
In 2002, a short lived British version aired on ITV, presented by former Atomic Kitten singer Kerry Katona. It generated some controversy when contestant Donovan Russell lodged a complaint with the Broadcasting Standards Commission alleging that the programme was "fixed" and contestants were told in advance who to pick. Although the complaint was not upheld, the series was dropped midway through its run.

References

External links 
 
 
 

2000s American game shows
2000s American reality television series
2001 American television series debuts
2006 American television series endings
American dating and relationship reality television series
ITV (TV network) original programming
Television series by Warner Bros. Television Studios
First-run syndicated television programs in the United States
2000s British game shows